Arogyavani is an initiative first conceptualized and implemented by the Government of Karnataka. It is a toll-free health helpline number ( Dial to 104 ) functioning 24/7 hrs for the convenience of general public. Arogyavani Health Information Helpline provides the medically validated advice, Health Related Schemes launched by various governments, health counseling services and also lodge the complaints against Healthcare service providers like Doctors, Hospital and corruption in Health sector.

Presence in other States of India 
After its success in Karnataka in agreement with Piramal Swasthya, the Government of Punjab started 104 Medical Helpline call center by entering into an agreement with Ziqitza Healthcare Limited from June 2014. In the state of Punjab, the services under the Arogyavani initiative are available in three languages namely Punjabi, Hindi and English. In its first year, the 104 medical helpline proved boon for 47,476 people in the state of Punjab.

In the state of Odisha and Chhattisgarh, Ziqitza Healthcare Limited operates 104 health helpline number through Tender processing under Public Private Partnership (PPP) with National Health Mission(NHM). The other states where 104 non-emergency medical helpline number is active are Assam, Chhattisgarh, Jharkhand, Gujarat, Rajasthan, Tamil Nadu, Telangana and Madhya Pradesh.

Objective 
The main objective of 104 Medical Helpline number is to provide information and advice for health related services to general public seeking answers or resolutions for the following concerned areas:
Information Directory for tracking health services providers/institutions, diagnostic services, hospitals etc.
Complaint Registration about person/institution relating to deficiency of services, negligence, corruption, etc. in government healthcare institutions.
Advice on long term ill conditions like diabetes, heart issues etc.
Response to health scares and other localized epidemics.
Counseling and advice (stress, depression, anxiety, post-trauma recovery, HIV, AIDS, RTI, STI etc.)
Health and symptoms checker (initial assessment, flu advice, pregnancy related information etc)
First aid information and advice.
Any other health related services/issues.

References 

Government of Karnataka
Telephone numbers
Three-digit telephone numbers